Saquib Nachan is known for being convicted for the 2002 and 2003 blasts at Mumbai Central railway station, Vile Parle and Mulund. Nachan was convicted for possessing weapons under the Prevention of Terrorist Act (POTA) and was sentenced to ten years' imprisonment. After being released from prison, Nachan left for his native town of Padhga with his relatives.

Personal life 
His father was the Zilla parishad Chief and a social worker. He graduated in Bcom and after completing his education ran a business of land development. His family owns a lot of land in the Borivli Village, Padgah, Thane district. Nachan has three children, two sons and a daughter.

Nachan was the former secretary of the banned Students' Islamic Movement of India.

Bomb Blast Incidents
The first of the 3 blasts was on December 6, 2002. A bomb exploded in the Mumbai Central railway station, killing none but injuring 27 persons. The second blast took place on January 27, 2003. one woman died when a bomb exploded in Vile Parle and 25 others were injured. On March 13 that year, a bomb exploded in a Karjat-bound train at Mulund station, leaving 11 dead and 82 injured.

Investigation 
Upon investigation the police discovered that some of the accused collected explosives, some collected AK-56s and they wanted to target prominent leaders belonging to right wing groups. They would also practice with those weapons on the hills at Padga. One of the accused had taken the police to the hills during the investigation.

Police had recovered many shells from the hills and forensic tests confirmed that the shells were from the seized weapons. Three weapons were seized from Nachan, Ateef and Haseeb. The bombs, were assembled at the clinic of Wahid while the forensic reports confirmed that the traces from the clinic matched with the traces in the explosion site.

Trial 
All accused in the Mumbai triple blasts were charged with murder, attempt to murder, causing grievous injuries, waging a war against the nation and criminal conspiracy and arms possession. They were booked under the Indian Penal Code, the Indian Railways Act, 1989, the Prevention of Damage to Public Property Act, the Arms Act, 1959, the Explosive Substances Act 1883 and the Prevention of Terrorism Act, 2002 (POTA). Nachan and Muzammil Ansari had been convicted, along with eight others. Nachan was accused by Mumbai Police as the mastermind of the blasts and he was arrested from Padgha of Thane district. Some of the other accused were - Ateef Mulla, Hasib Mulla, Ghulam Kotal, Mohammed Kamil, Noor Malik, Anwar Ali Khan, Farhaan Khot and Wahid Ansari. The court found him guilty of illegally possessing an AK-56 Rifle and sentenced him to 10 years jail term.

Aftermath
He was released in November 2017, Nachan completed 10 years of punishment out of which one year and eight months were spent as a convict at the Thane Central Jail, while the remaining period was spent as an undertrial.

References

Living people
Year of birth missing (living people)